The Supreme Court of Tajikistan is the most senior body of civil, criminal, and administrative law in the Republic of Tajikistan.

History 
During the Soviet era, the Supreme Court of the Tajik SSR served as the highest judicial body in the Soviet republic of Tajikistan. In 1924, the People’s Commissariat of Justice (now the Justice Ministry) was created on Tajik territory. 5 years later, the Supreme Court was created. In accordance with the law "On the Judicial System in the Tajik SSR" adopted on 11 December 1981, the Supreme Court of the Tajik SSR was made into independent institution that was elected by the Supreme Soviet of the Tajik SSR. During the transitional period of independence of 1992–1993 which occurred after the collapse of the USSR, the judicial authorities of Tajikistan continued to operate on the basis of the 1978 Constitution of the Tajik SSR until a new judicial law would be adopted. The Supreme Court of the Republic of Tajikistan was reformed on 28 December 1993. As of 2019, the Supreme Court currently consists of 16 judges.

List of chairmen since independence 
 Fayzullo Abdulloev (1996–2000)
 Salimboi Fatkhulloev (2000–2006)
 Nusratullo Abdulloev (2006–2015)
 Shermuhammad Shokhiyon (2015–Present)

Organizational structure 
The Supreme Court is the highest body in the judicial system which consists of the following elements:

Civil and criminal court
Supreme Economic Court
Military courts (organized by military garrisons)
Regional courts

The Supreme Court itself consists of the following:
 Plenum
 Presidium
 Judicial board for civil cases
 Judicial board for criminal cases
 Judicial board for administrative cases
 Judicial board for family cases
 Military Collegium

References

Law of Tajikistan
Government of Tajikistan
Tajikistan
Tajikistan
1929 establishments in the Soviet Union